Pindushi is an urban locality (an urban-type settlement) in Medvezhyegorsky District of the Republic of Karelia, Russia, located on the northern tip of Lake Onega,  north of Petrozavodsk, the capital of the republic. As of the 2010 Census, its population was 4,598.

History
It was established in 1933 and granted urban-type settlement status in 1950.

Administrative and municipal status
Within the framework of administrative divisions, the urban-type settlement of Pindushi is subordinated to Medvezhyegorsky District. As a municipal division, Pindushi, together with eight rural localities, is incorporated within Medvezhyegorsky Municipal District as Pindushskoye Urban Settlement.

References

Notes

Sources

Urban-type settlements in the Republic of Karelia
Medvezhyegorsky District